In March 1958, the Commonwealth of Virginia renumbered four of its state highways as the Interstate Renumbering of 1958 in order to avoid duplication with the new Interstate Highway System.

New routes

Former routes

Related changes
SR 295 was renumbered to SR 215 in 1961
SR 195 was renumbered to SR 186 in 1973.

References

CTB Meeting Archives

1958 in transport
1958 in Virginia
Highway renumbering in the United States
 Renumbering 1958
 Renumbering 1958